Optics is the second album of the Illinois-based industrial band, I:Scintilla. It was released with two versions, a single disc version and a limited edition two disc version containing remixes.

Track listing 
 "Cursive Eve" - 5:33
 "Toy Soldier" - 3:53
 "The Bells" - 4:32
 "Melt" - 5:22
 "Translate" - 4:01
 "Scin" - 4:33
 "Machine Vision" - 4:37
 "Havestar" - 4:37
 "Ultravioletfly" - 4:07
 "Silhouette" - 4:15
 "Taken" - 4:38
 "Salt of Stones" - 4:52

Bonus CD Track Listings 
 "The Bells [Angelspit Mix]" - 4:59
 "Scin [Clan of Xymox Mix]" - 5:33
 "Havestar [Combichrist Mix]" - 4:41
 "Cursive Eve [Zero Tolerance Treatment by Deathboy]" - 5:25
 "The Bells [Ego Likeness Mix]" - 6:01
 "Taken [En Take Mix by En Esch]" - 5:51
 "The Bells [Interface Mix]" - 5:18
 "Translate [Broken Reception Mix by Manufactura]" - 4:47
 "Havestar [LA Malediction Mix by Mortis]" - 4:29
 "Capsella [Stochastic Theory Mix]" - 4:36
 "Scin [Tolchock Mix]" - 5:12
 "Taken [Shaken Mix by En Esch]" - 5:28

References

I:Scintilla albums
2007 albums